Zurnabad (also, Surnabab, Zhurnadad, and Zurnadad) is a village and municipality in the Goygol Rayon of Azerbaijan.  It has a population of 1,273.  The municipality consists of the villages of Zurnabad, Aşağı Zurnabad, and Gəncə.

References 

Populated places in Goygol District